Kalleh Jub (also Romanized as Kalleh Jūb; also known as Kalahjū) is a village in Sar Firuzabad Rural District, Firuzabad District, Kermanshah County, Kermanshah Province, Iran. At the 2006 census, its population was 385, in 80 families.

References 

Populated places in Kermanshah County